Archibald Herman Müller (11 March 1878 –  24 September 1960) was an artist of realistic paintings and one of India's early 20th Century great talents.

Müller, the son of a German father and Indian mother , was born in Cochin in the Southern Indian state of Kerala, and lived and worked in India.  He joined the Madras School of Art and received early recognition. He won the gold medal at Madras School of Art. After completing his education, he worked with his brother in his photography studio for some time.

Müller went to Bombay (now Mumbai) in 1911, then considered the modern artistic centre of India. He won the Gold Medal from the Bombay Art Society in the same year. He travelled a lot through Maharashtra, Rajasthan, Gujarat and the Himalayas, enjoying the patronage of various Indian royal families. His paintings included landscapes, portraits and scenes from the life of the Maharajas (Kings), historical subjects and incidents from the Hindu epics, the Ramayana and the Mahabharata. His paintings have been acquired by the Buckingham Palace, London, the South Kensington Museum (now known as the Victoria and Albert Museum). Few also exist in the collections of the museums at Sangli, Maharashtra Bikaner, Rajasthan, the Jodhpur Fort and the Royal Palace at Jaipur. His paintings are much sought after and have surfaced in various auctions in recent years.

Müller died in 1960 at the Gandhi Hospital in Jodhpur, Rajasthan, India.

His children  moved from India in the 1950s and 1960s. Two daughters, Gwendoline Ellen and Winifred Rose, moved to the UK, and his son, Archibald Hermann Müller (known as Hermann), to Australia in 1967. Several individuals from succeeding generations of his family have proved to be talented artists and writers, some exhibiting nationally and internationally. One of his daughters, Gwendoline (1929-2012), who lived in Prestatyn, North Wales, auctioned many of her paintings for charity. Winifred (Winnie) (1930-2016), also lived in North Wales and continued to paint into her eighties. Son Hermann (1936-2017), inspired by his father's paintings at an early age, expressed his creative talents as an author, and, having studied the bodymind connection, founded the Psychosomatic Therapy College and developed the Psychosomatic Therapy Process which is taught in many countries . Hermann lived on the Gold Coast, Queensland. Highly accomplished contemporary artist Charlotte McGowan-Griffin (1975-), born in London and based in Berlin , is a great-granddaughter of A H Müller.

References

Book: Artist A. H. Muller and His Art
Goa Art Gallery
Art and Nationalism in Colonial India, 1850 - 1922 by Partha Mitter, Page 96

External links

Great Indian Art
Goa Art Gallery
A H Muller

Realist painters
1878 births
1960 deaths
Government College of Fine Arts, Chennai alumni
Artists from Kochi
Indian portrait painters
20th-century Indian painters
Painters from Kerala
Indian male painters
20th-century Indian male artists